Elizabeth Pangelinan Perez "Belle" Arriola (November 19, 1928 – June 26, 2002) was a Guamanian educator and a Democratic Party of Guam politician in Guam. Arriola served as Senator in the Guam Legislature for 6 consecutive terms, from 1983 to 1995, and was the wife of former Speaker in the Guam Legislature Joaquin C. Arriola.

Early life
Elizabeth grew up during the occupation of Guam by Japanese Imperial Forces during World War II and accompanied her mother and grandmother to Manenggon concentration camp toward the end of the occupation.

Education and early career
Elizabeth graduated as salutatorian from George Washington Senior High School after the end of World War II.
Elizabeth earned a Bachelor of Arts at Rosemont College and returned to Guam to teach in 1952.

Guam Legislature

Elections
Arriola was first elected to the Guam Legislature in 1982 and remained in office 6 legislative terms.

Leadership
 Legislative Secretary, 17th Guam Legislature (1983-1985)
 Legislative Secretary, 18th Guam Legislature (1985-1987)

Personal life
Arriola married attorney Joaquin C. Arriola, an attorney and later a senator in the Guam Legislature.

References

External links 
 

1928 births
2002 deaths
20th-century American politicians
20th-century American women politicians
Chamorro people
Guamanian Democrats
Guamanian people of Spanish descent
Guamanian Roman Catholics
Members of the Legislature of Guam